Dead Right is an early short film by Edgar Wright, later famous for the TV programme Spaced and the film Shaun of the Dead. It was filmed in 1992 and 1993 in his hometown of Wells, England when Wright was only 18. He wrote, edited, produced and directed the film as well as shooting and recording the sound. It is a Zucker Brothers-style comedy that parodies the action thriller genre, most notably the Dirty Harry series (Dead Right was the working title for the original Dirty Harry). The film is shot on SVHS and contains an impressive cast of 70 actors (mostly amateur), mainly made up of Wright's school friends and colleagues. Clips from the film were first broadcast on Take Over TV – the Channel 4 series consisting entirely of video clips sent in by viewers – that also launched the careers of comedy duo Adam and Joe.

Plot
Dead Right opens with a parody of the Simon Bates intro that used to accompany VHS rentals where Bates would explain to the viewer what certificate the film had received – 18 apparently – and what adult content they could expect to see.

Dead Right begins with a serial killer bumping off the residents of a small Somerset community. Maverick DI Barry Stern is assigned to the case and – despite his reluctance – is partnered with by-the-book fellow DI Mike Tight.

On their first time out together Barry shoots a dealer trying to sell him cocaine in a public toilet. Meanwhile, the killer stalks a woman home from the supermarket and kills her by electrocution with a kitchen light.

Mike and Barry show up at the scene of the crime and discover the woman electrocuted to death. A box of cereal has been left on her head leading Barry to surmise that they are now looking for a cereal killer.

Back at the precinct Mike addresses his fellow inspectors. He tells them that to catch the killer they must look at and obey the formula that most cop movies go by even though it is a British movie and there won't be any car chases. Barry points out that the partner usually dies in these kind of movies but Mike says he is thinking more along the lines of the Lethal Weapon films.

The following day the police stakeout the local supermarket where they expect the killer to strike next. Barry is disguised as a mime. Mike is disguised an old lady to ensnare the killer. A small boy asks Barry for a mime. Barry gives him the finger that leads to him getting beaten up by the boy's elder brother.

Meanwhile, Mike proceeds to the local park followed by the killer. Once there he realises he is being followed and radios for help but it's too late. The killer attacks Mike and stabs him. Barry arrives on bike to find Mike dying. Mike says he loves Barry and gets him to give him a final kiss. Before he dies he tells him to look in the script to see where the killer is hiding out.

Barry arrives at a creepy looking house. There he is captured by the killer and tied to a chair. Barry says he knows who he is and proceeds to tell him his back-story: The killer is Philip Quinn. As a child he was made to eat cereal every day. He couldn't do it and in later years developed an inferiority complex about it. He then murdered his parents with a Black and Decker jigsaw and inherited their estate. He surrounded himself with waifs and strays that, like him, were hooked on cereal and slowly built up an army of hockey stick-carrying box-men. He got a job at the local supermarket to satisfy his desire for cereal but he couldn't stand it when people would buy it for themselves and so he would follow them home and murder them.

Philip leaves Barry under the watchful eye of his beautiful sister Antonia. She seduces him and ten seconds later they are lying in bed together post-coitus. Barry handcuffs her to the chair and makes his escape.

Outside Barry encounters one of the box-men. He manages to defeat him by jumping on his face, which blows up. Meanwhile, Antonia sounds the alarm which summons a whole army of box-men. They chase him into a room that turns out to be an armoury. He tools-up and proceeds outside to face his adversaries. A gun battle ensues during which Barry discovers that one of the box-men is MI5 undercover agent Nigel Roscoe. The pair join forces to fend off the box-men. After a lengthy action sequence they manage to slaughter the army leading to much splatter and carnage. However, by this point Antonia has escaped and she hurls a knife into Nigel's back killing him. Barry shoots Antonia in the head.

Back at the supermarket Philip is working. Barry turns up to catch him but DI Jackson is waiting there to take Barry in. Barry subdues Philip but when Jackson interferes Barry lets Philip go to recapture him elsewhere. He tells Jackson not to follow him and lays chase.

In the local park Philip takes Edgar the director hostage and kills him. Barry breaks character, grabs a passing extra and gets her to direct the rest of the film.

Barry corners Philip in a playground. The pair have a showdown where they fight it out one-on-one. The fight culminates with Barry shooting Philip in the chest but only after reciting the "do you feel lucky" speech from Dirty Harry. Philip begs for mercy and says he wants to be Barry's best friend. Barry shoots him in the head.

As the police show up to clear up the mess Barry has created he sits forlornly on a park bench. Disillusioned with the police he throws his badge away before rifling through his pockets and pulling out a pin, a police radio and a grenade. As Dead Right comes to an end, realizing too late that the pin was actually from the grenade and it goes off.

Cast
 Edward Scotland as Barry Stern
 Martin Curtis as Philip Quinn
 Richard Green as Mike Tight
 Oliver Evans as Jackson
 Peter Wild as Chief
 Gavin Elwood as Enfield Bow
 Rob Yarde as Nigel Roscoe
 Amy Bowles as Antonia Quinn
 Graham Low as The Box Monster
 Ian Hill as Dead Before Credits
 David Scotland as Simon Bates
 David Denning as Gateway Employee (Cameo)
 Gregory Curtis as Young Philip Quinn
 Daniel Rowlinson as The Ginger Kid
 Quentin Green as vexed cop
 Nicola Harrison as Useless Hostage/"Stand-in Director"

Production
Director Edgar Wright had won a Super VHS camera from a competition on the Saturday morning kids TV show Going Live! and so was able to make his own amateur shorts. At the time of the film's production he was a student at the Arts Institute of Bournemouth and would only be able to shoot the film whilst back home during term breaks.

The shooting script was only a first draft and not properly formatted. The budget for the film came solely out of Wright's pocket and went mainly on tape stock, props (water pistols painted black), costumes and food colouring. The surprisingly large cast was made up of his friends but he has said he went "outside my social circle" when it came to filling all the roles the film had to offer.

Dead Right contains many early examples of filming techniques that would later become Wright's trademarks such as transitions, whip-pans, wipes, tracking steady-cam shots and dolly zooms. However, there are very few sound effects unlike his later films for example Hot Fuzz where there is a heavy reliance on sound.

Both Dead Right and Hot Fuzz were attempts to film a British cop movie in the style of an American cop movie. Wright says "There was a little wave of sub-standard British thrillers I used to think were quite pathetic trying to take on the Americans at their own game and failing miserably. That was the germ of the idea . . . to have our cake and eat it by both examining the gulf between British action films and American ones and trying to become more American."

References

 Hot Fuzz DVD
 Am Blam: Making Dead Right
 Edgar Wright's Commentary
 Blog about the film
 Dead Right on YouTube
 Dead Right on IMDB

1993 short films
1993 films
British short films
British buddy cop films
Films directed by Edgar Wright
Films with screenplays by Edgar Wright
1990s English-language films
1990s British films
British comedy television films